Monagea GAA club is a Gaelic Athletic Association club located in the parish of Monagea, County Limerick, Ireland. The club was founded in 1896 and fields teams in both hurling and Gaelic football. 

Players from this parish have won both All Ireland hurling and football medals at the top level. Willie Hough won two hurling medals, in 1918 and 1921 and Ned Cregan won an All Ireland Hurling medal in 1934, While Larry Sheahan won a football medal with Limerick in 1896 and another with Dublin ten years later.

External links
Monagea GAA site

Gaelic games clubs in County Limerick
Hurling clubs in County Limerick
Gaelic football clubs in County Limerick